Dutch eggplant is a common name for several plants and may refer to:

Solanum betaceum (also known by the common name tamarillo)
Solanum aculeatissimum